Melalgus plicatus is a species of horned powder-post beetle in the family Bostrichidae. It is found in Central America, North America, and South America.

References

Notes

 
 
 
 

Bostrichidae
Articles created by Qbugbot
Beetles described in 1874